Edgar Arthur Singer Jr. (November 13, 1873 – April 4, 1954) was an American philosopher, professor at the University of Pennsylvania, and proponent of experimentalism.

Life and work 
Singer was a graduate student of George S. Fullerton (1839–1925) at the University of Pennsylvania, where he  received his Ph.D. in psychology in 1894 with the thesis entitled "On the composite nature of consciousness." After his dissertation, he briefly taught at Harvard for William James as an instructor in the psychology laboratory. He was professor at the University of Pennsylvania from 1909 until 1943. His pupils included Henry Bradford Smith, Edwin Ray Guthrie Jr., C. West Churchman, Russell L. Ackoff and Gordon Clark.

Singer believed that consciousness was a historical construct and, as such, it was not a suitable object for a scientific psychology. As an object to unify psychology research, he suggested behavior, which was observable. He denied he was the father of Behaviorism. He was not a materialist. Neither was Singer an empiricist. His epistemology for a science of psychology was self described as Empirical-Idealism.

Most importantly, Singer carried on the philosophy of Pragmatism, which began with Charles Sanders Peirce, a conception which was greatly extended by William James and John Dewey, to the University of Pennsylvania.  Thus informing the Department Chair of philosophy Thomas A. Cowan, C. West Churchman, and Russell L. Ackoff of the merits of describing the world functionally.

One student of Ackoff, W. Curtiss Priest, continued the conception, teaching Ackoff's 1967 book Choice, Communication, and Conflict at the Emma Willard School in 1971.  Beginning in 2004, Priest and P. Kenneth Komoski published numerous papers under the Association for the Advancement of Computing in Education (AACE, see ED-Media) extending Pragmatism, which they prefer calling Functionalism, as a method to combine knowledge across the disciplines in an Internet-based hub called The Netting.

Publications  
 1924, Modern thinkers and present problem
 1924, Mind as behavior
 1925, Fool's advice
 1936, On the contented life
 1948, In search of a way of life
 1959, Experience and reflection

About Singer
 Clarke, F. P., & Nahm, M. C., (Eds.). (1942). Philosophical essays in honor of Edgar Arthur Singer Jr.  Philadelphia: University of Pennsylvania Press.
 Anonymous. (1942). Singer, Prof. Edgar Arthur Jr., in J. Cattell (ed.), Directory of American scholars: A biographical directory (pp. 762). Lancaster, PA.: The Science Press. (Third printing, 1966.)
 Krikorian, Y. H. (1962). Singer's philosophy of experimentalism.  Philosophy of Science , Vol.  29(1), pp. 81–91
 Nahm, M. C. (1957). Edgar A. Singer Jr. and the aesthetic of empirical idealism. Journal of Philosophy, Vol. 54 (14–26), pp. 584–594.
 Anonymous. (1966). Singer, Edgar Arthur Jr., in Who was who in America. Vol. 3, 1951–1960 (p. 789). Chicago: Marquis. (Third printing, 1966.)
 Churchman, C. W. (1971). Singerian inquiring systems. In The design of inquiring systems: Basic principles of systems and organization. New York: Basic Books (pp. 186–205).
 Anonymous. (1977). Philosophy of science. In P. E. Peters (Ed.), Encyclopedia of Library and Information Science. Vol. 22 (pp. 183–203). New York: Marcel Dekker.
 Churchman, C.W. (1982a). An appreciation of Edgar Arthur Singer Jr., in C.W. Churchman, Thought and Wisdom,  Intersystems Publications, Seaside, Calif., Ch. 10, pp. 116–135.
 Britton, G. A., & McCallion, H. (1994). An overview of the Singer/Churchman/Ackoff school of thought. Systems Practice, Vol 7 (5), 487-521
 Richardson, S. M., Courtney, J. F., & Paradice, D. B. (2001). An assessment of the Singerian inquiring organizational model: Cases from academia and the utility industry. Information Systems Frontiers, Vol 1, 49-62. (Abstract at http://www.kluweronline.com/issn/1387-3326/. Retrieved 1 June 2001.)

References

External links 

 https://web.archive.org/web/20080820203719/http://www.pragmatism.org/dmap/apa_presidents.htm
  - includes useful background on Singer
 Edgar Arthur Singer by Andrew Basden, 2005.
 Quality-control of information, by Kristo Ivanov,  an example of application of Singer's thought as represented in C. West Churchman's work.

1873 births
1954 deaths
American philosophers